56th Group may refer to:

 56th Fighter Group, a unit of the United States Army Air Force 
 56th Operations Group, a unit of the United States Air Force

See also
 56th Division (disambiguation)
 56th Brigade (disambiguation)
 56th Regiment (disambiguation)
 56th Squadron (disambiguation)